The Sitting Bull Monument, on  Standing Rock Indian Reservation near Mobridge in Corson County, South Dakota, was built in 1953.  It was listed on the National Register of Historic Places in 2006.

It is a sculpture by Korczak Ziolkowski of Sitting Bull.

References

Buildings and structures completed in 1953
National Register of Historic Places in Corson County, South Dakota